is a Japanese male volleyball player. He was part of the Japan men's national volleyball team. On club level he plays for Suntory Sunbirds in V.League division 1.

On February 10, 2023, Suntory Sunbirds announced that Masasha Kuriyama was set to retire after the season 2022-2023. The retirement ceremony will be held on Match 18 2023.

References

External links
 profile at FIVB.org

1988 births
Living people
Japanese men's volleyball players
People from Saga Prefecture
Sportspeople from Saga Prefecture
20th-century Japanese people
21st-century Japanese people